Zephaniah Ncube (born 10 January 1957, died before 2007) is a Zimbabwean long-distance runner who competed in the 1980 Summer Olympics and in the 1984 Summer Olympics. Personal Bests: 5000 – 13:24.07 (1984); 10000 – 28:18.2 (1988).

References

1957 births
Year of death missing
Zimbabwean male long-distance runners
Olympic athletes of Zimbabwe
Athletes (track and field) at the 1980 Summer Olympics
Athletes (track and field) at the 1984 Summer Olympics
Athletes (track and field) at the 1982 Commonwealth Games
Commonwealth Games competitors for Zimbabwe